HMS Blackburn was a Hunt class minesweeper of the Royal Navy from World War I. She was originally to be named Burnham, but this was changed to avoid any conflict between the vessel name and a coastal location.

See also
 Blackburn, Lancashire

References
 

 

Hunt-class minesweepers (1916)
1918 ships